ROKS Yang Man-chun (DDH-973) is the third ship of the Gwangaetto the Great-class in the Republic of Korea Navy. She is named after Yang Man-chun.

Development
The KDX-I was designed to replace the old destroyers in the ROKN that were transferred from the US Navy in the 1950s and 1960s. It was thought to be a major turning point for the ROKN in that the launching of the first KDX-I meant that ROKN finally had a capability to project power far from its shores. After the launching of the ship, there was a massive boom in South Korean international participation against piracy and military operations other than war.

Construction and career
ROKS Yang Man-chun was launched on 30 September 1998 by Daewoo Shipbuilding and commissioned on 29 June 2000.

RIMPAC 2008
ROKS Yang Man-chun and ROKS Munmu the Great participated in RIMPAC 2008 and they were part of 's battle group.

Gallery

References

1998 ships 
Gwanggaeto the Great-class destroyers 
ships built by Daewoo Shipbuilding & Marine Engineering